The Trade Union Commission (SK; , CS) was a national trade union federation in Belgium.

History
The federation was established on 11 April 1898, at a conference of the Belgian Workers' Party (BWP).  It hoped to increase union membership, while linking unions with the BWP and the socialist movement.  It initially focused on lobbying for legislation to improve working conditions, and encouraging affiliated unions to merge.  From 1903, it published the Korrespondentieblad journal.

In its early years, the SK made some headway in obtaining compensation for workplace injuries, and a state pension.  In 1902, it led a general strike in support of universal suffrage, a key policy of the BWP.  However, the strike failed, and more than half the SK's membership then left.  From 1905, the SK became increasingly independent of the BWP, firstly by removing the party's ability to nominate half of its executive, then from 1906 by admitting unions which did not themselves affiliate with the BWP.  In 1913, the union led another general strike, and this proved more successful, ultimately leading to universal suffrage in 1919.  Around this time, it also secured the right for state employees to join unions, and the abolition of a law which targeted radical trade unionists with lengthy prison sentences.

From 1921, the affiliated membership of the SK declined, as the country entered a long depression.  The federation managed to obtain some further improvements in working conditions in the 1920s, and persuaded more of its affiliates to merge.  The 1930s saw the economic situation worsen, and some gains were lost, but a major strike in 1936, led by the SK but backed by the General Confederation of Liberal Trade Unions of Belgium and the Confederation of Christian Trade Unions, obtained major gains including paid leave, a minimum wage, and a 40-hour working week for many workers.

In 1937, the SK decided that it needed to adopt a more centralised structure, and gain more independence from the BWP.  As a result, at the end of the year, it reformed itself as the General Labour Confederation of Belgium.

Affiliates

Leadership

Presidents
1911: Jules Solau
1930: Jean Baeck
1931: Edward De Vlaemynck

General secretaries
1921: Corneel Mertens

References

Trade unions in Belgium
1898 establishments in Belgium
Trade unions established in 1898
Trade unions disestablished in 1937
National federations of trade unions
1937 disestablishments in Belgium